"The Sponge" is the 119th episode of the NBC sitcom Seinfeld. This was the ninth episode for the seventh season. It aired on December 7, 1995. In this episode, George and Elaine face sexual crises when the Today brand of contraceptive sponges is taken off the market, while Kramer participates in an AIDS walk and Jerry dates a tireless do-gooder whose phone number he got from the list of Kramer's sponsors.

Plot
At Monk's Café, Kramer asks Jerry and Elaine to sponsor him for an AIDS walk. On the list of sponsors Jerry sees Lena Small, whom he wanted to call for a date, but her number is unlisted. Jerry takes down the number and calls Lena. Elaine, excited by how things are going with her boyfriend, Billy, says she is going shopping for contraceptive sponges. Kramer informs her the sponge was taken off the market. Jerry boasts that he has been wearing size 31 pants since college. George tells his fiancée Susan that Jerry actually wears size 32 and modifies the tag to a 31; this initiates a fight about sharing other people's secrets.

Firmly unwilling to change birth control methods, Elaine goes on a hunt for the sponges. After visiting multiple stores which are out of stock, she purchases 60 sponges at Pasteur Pharmacy. Jerry tells George that he found Lena on the AIDS walk list. George then tells Susan against Jerry's wishes, resolving their argument. This passes along the phone tree until it reaches Lena. When Lena tells him she doesn't mind him taking her number from the AIDS walk list, he gets turned off from her being "too good", assuming she must also be chaste. Jerry tells George he is "out of the loop" because he told Susan. Determined that her 60 sponges must last the rest of her life, Elaine refuses to give one to George so that he can have makeup sex with Susan and puts Billy through a rigorous examination to make sure he is "sponge-worthy". Although their first sexual encounter leaves her with no regrets, she denies him morning-after sex, unwilling to spare two sponges. With George and Susan suffering increasing sexual frustration for lack of the sponge, she convinces him to use a condom, but by the time they get the wrapper open his erection has passed.

When Kramer is exhausted just from walking up the stairs to his apartment, Jerry fears he is too out-of-shape to do the AIDS walk. Despite Jerry's warnings, Kramer stays up all the night before playing poker. At the AIDS walk, he refuses to wear an AIDS ribbon. "Ribbon bullies", led by Bob and Cedric, beat Kramer nearly senseless. He still manages to stumble across the finishing line before collapsing; Jerry, however, assumes this was because of his staying up all night and walks away in scorn. George see that Kramer is not wearing a ribbon and asks him where his ribbon is.

At Lena's, Jerry finds half her closet space is occupied by contraceptive sponges and realizes that she is not chaste at all. However, he is compelled to tell her his secret about his pant size and she dumps him.

Production
Peter Mehlman was inspired to write this episode when he heard that the extremely popular Today sponge was being taken off the market. His initial plan was to dovetail Elaine's hoarding of the Today sponge with Kramer and Newman trying to run a stock market scam, George and a girl agreeing to date for a week and then break up by mutual consent, and Jerry trying to conceal from Lena the fact that he got her number from an AIDS walk list. These additional plot threads were either drastically reworked or completely replaced. Mehlman had in fact once obtained a woman's unlisted number from an AIDS walk list. The idea of Jerry modifying the waist size on the tag of his pants was contributed by Jerry Seinfeld himself.

The "ribbon bullies" story was motivated by the Seinfeld crew's dislike for being expected to wear AIDS ribbons at the Emmy Awards. The AIDS walk scene was filmed on the Central Park set of the CBS Radford lot.

Elaine's statement that she's going to do a "hard target search of every drug store, general store, health store, grocery store in a 25-block radius" is a parody of a similar statement made by Samuel Gerard in the 1993 film The Fugitive.

Option pricing 

A paper by Avinash Dixit used this episode to explore an option value problem in determining the "spongeworthiness" of potential partners.

References

External links
 

Seinfeld (season 7) episodes
1995 American television episodes